The 2016 Serie A Playoffs were the final phase of the 2015–16 Serie A season. They started on 7 May and finished on 15 June 2016, with the 2016 Lega Basket Serie A Finals.

Banco di Sardegna Sassari was the defending champions.

EA7 Emporio Armani Milano won their 27th title by beating Grissin Bon Reggio Emilia in game 6 of the finals.

Qualified teams
The eight first qualified teams after the end of the 2015–16 Serie A regular season qualified to the playoffs.

Bracket
 As of 13 June 2016.

Quarterfinals
The semifinals will be played in a best of five format from 8 May to 16 May 2016.

Sidigas Avellino v Giorgio Tesi Group Pistoia

Grissin Bon Reggio Emilia v Banco di Sardegna Sassari

EA7 Emporio Armani Milano v Dolomiti Energia Trento

Vanoli Cremona v Umana Reyer Venezia

Semifinals
The semifinals will be played in a best of seven format from 19 May to 31 May 2016.

Grissin Bon Reggio Emilia v Sidigas Avellino

EA7 Emporio Armani Milano v Umana Reyer Venezia

Finals

The finals will be played in a best of seven format from 3 to 15 June 2016.

EA7 Emporio Armani Milano v Grissin Bon Reggio Emilia

References

External links
Official website

Playoffs